Count Carl Edward Vilhelm Piper (1820 - 1891) was a Swedish nobleman and diplomat. In the beginning of his career he worked in the Swedish Foreign Office and had served as Swedish-Norwegian legation-secretary in Copenhagen during the Crimean War. In the late 1850s he served as envoyée to Italy. In 1861 he was appointed minister to the United States and served to 1864, when he was replaced by Baron de Wetterstedt. Initially, Piper was very critical of Americans and the U.S. political system, Americans lacked love of the nation and the constitution needed to be changed. In 1864 he moderated his views, and believed that Americans were basically all right. 
Piper was very close to Secretary of State William H. Seward.

References

External links 
 Biography (in Swedish)

1820 births
1891 deaths
Consuls-general of Sweden
Ambassadors of Sweden to the United States
Ambassadors of Sweden to Italy
Ambassadors of Sweden to Austria
Ambassadors of Sweden to the United Kingdom